Biplab Mitra is an Indian politician and the present Minister of Agricultural Marketing in the Government of West Bengal. He is also an MLA, elected from the  Harirampur constituency in the 2021 West Bengal Legislative Assembly election.

References 

State cabinet ministers of West Bengal
Living people
Year of birth missing (living people)
People from Dakshin Dinajpur district